Silvano Martina (born 20 March 1953) is an Italian retired professional footballer who played as a goalkeeper. He now works as an agent, notably for Gianluigi Buffon and has also worked for Nemanja Vidić during his career. 

Martina was born in Sarajevo, SR Bosnia and Herzegovina, to Italian parents, then part of SFR Yugoslavia. He started his football career at hometown club Željezničar, before moving to Italy as a 13 year old in 1966 and then playing in the youth teams of Genovese and Esperia.

Martina made his Serie A debut for Inter Milan in a match against Palermo on 6 May 1973.

Honours

Player
Torino
Serie B: 1989–90

References

External links
Silvano Martina at Footballdatabase 

1953 births
Living people
Footballers from Sarajevo
Italian footballers
Serie A players
Serie B players
Inter Milan players
A.S. Sambenedettese players
S.S.D. Varese Calcio players
Brescia Calcio players
Genoa C.F.C. players
Torino F.C. players
S.S. Lazio players
Hellas Verona F.C. players
Association football goalkeepers